Asterolasia elegans is a species of slender, erect shrub that is endemic to a restricted area of New South Wales. It has dense, woolly, rusty star-shaped hairs on its stems, lance-shaped leaves densely covered with white and rust-coloured hairs on the lower surface, and white flowers arranged singly or in groups of up to nine in leaf axils or on the ends of branchlets, the back of the petals densely covered with woolly, white hairs.

Description
The leaves are covered with white and rusty-red star-shaped hairs, densely so on the lower surface.

Taxonomy
Asterolasia elegans was first formally described in 1990 by Lyn McDougall and Marianne F. Porteners in the journal Telopea from specimens collected by McDougall near Maroota in 1989.

Distribution and habitat
This species grows in moist places on hillsides in forests north of Sydney.

Conservation status
The main threats to the species include inappropriate fire regimes, habitat loss, weed invasion and grazing by feral animals and domestic livestock.

References

elegans
Flora of New South Wales
Plants described in 1990